Romberger-Stover House is a historic home located at Berrysburg, Dauphin County, Pennsylvania. The original house was built in 1842; it is now the rear wing and measures 20 feet by 24 feet.  The main house was added in 1887.  It is a two-story, wood-frame Queen Anne-style dwelling measuring 22 feet by 32 feet. It features a porch supported by Corinthian order columns. The porch was added in 1898.

It was added to the National Register of Historic Places in 1980.

References

Houses on the National Register of Historic Places in Pennsylvania
Queen Anne architecture in Pennsylvania
Houses completed in 1842
Houses in Dauphin County, Pennsylvania
National Register of Historic Places in Dauphin County, Pennsylvania